Mean Streets is an original novel by Terrance Dicks  featuring the fictional archaeologist Bernice Summerfield. The New Adventures were a spin-off from the long-running British science fiction television series Doctor Who.

1997 British novels
1997 science fiction novels
Virgin New Adventures
Bernice Summerfield novels
British science fiction novels
Novels by Terrance Dicks